These are the Billboard magazine number-one albums of 1957. These number-one albums are from the chart Best-Selling Pop Albums. On October 7, 1957, the name of the chart was changed to Best-Selling Pop LPs.

Chart history

See also
1957 in music
List of number-one albums (United States)

References

1957
United States Albums